Michal Sýkora (born 5 July 1973) is a Czech former professional ice hockey defenseman who played in the National Hockey League (NHL) for the San Jose Sharks, Chicago Blackhawks, Tampa Bay Lightning and Philadelphia Flyers. He is not related to the NHL hockey player Petr Sýkora who played with the New Jersey Devils in the 2011-12 season. He is the older brother to Petr Sýkora, who played 12 NHL games.

Playing career
Sýkora started his NHL career with the San Jose Sharks in 1993–94. He joined the Chicago Blackhawks  for the 1996–97 season and played in 28 games. He recorded a respectable +/- of 4 and scored 1 goal. Sýkora could not reprise these statistics with the Blackhawks. He recorded a +/- of -10 in the same number of games in the 1997–98 season. He was traded to the Tampa Bay Lightning for Mark Fitzpatrick and a 4th-round draft choice in 1999. Sýkora signed as a free agent with Philadelphia for the 2000–01 season, leaving the NHL after that season.

Career statistics

Regular season and playoffs

International

Awards
 WHL West First All-Star Team – 1993

External links
 
 Flyers "Czechmates" insert

1973 births
Chicago Blackhawks players
Czech ice hockey defencemen
HC Dynamo Pardubice players
HC Sparta Praha players
Ice hockey players at the 2002 Winter Olympics
Indianapolis Ice players
Kansas City Blades players
Living people
Olympic ice hockey players of the Czech Republic
Sportspeople from Pardubice
Philadelphia Flyers players
San Jose Sharks draft picks
San Jose Sharks players
Tacoma Rockets players
Tampa Bay Lightning players